Sonneborn is a municipality in Thuringia, Germany.

Sonneborn may also refer to:
 Harry J. Sonneborn (died 1992), executive of McDonald's
 Jan Martín Sonneborn (born 1984), German-Israeli-Spanish basketball player
 Jessica Sonneborn, American actress, writer, director and stunt double
 Engelbert Sonneborn (born 1938), German retired career counselor and independent candidate at the 2017 German presidential election
 Martin Sonneborn (born 1965),  German satirist
 Rudolf Sonneborn (1898–1986), American businessman, led the Sonneborn Institute
 Tracy Sonneborn (1905–1981),  American biologist
 Sonneborn–Berger score, tool to decide ranking of Swiss system tournament in chess and other games
 Sonneborn (Nuhne), a river of North Rhine-Westphalia, Germany, tributary of the Nuhne
 Sonneborn Building, also known as Paca-Pratt Building, a historic loft building in Baltimore, Maryland, United States